Department of Administration, Ministry of Administration, and Office of Administration and similar names are titles used by multiple organisations, most commonly national or sub-national administrations:

United States governmental organisations

National
 Office of Administration an entity within the Executive Office of the President
  a component office of the law enforcement arm of the Environmental Protection Agency

State
 Alaska Department of Administration an agency of the Government of Alaska
 Indiana Department of Administration an agency of the government of Indiana
 Kansas Department of Administration a department of the state of Kansas
 Minnesota Department of Administration an agency of the state of Minnesota
 Nevada State Department of Administration an agency of the Nevada state government
 North Carolina Department of Administration a cabinet-level agency in North Carolina
 Pennsylvania Office of Administration a cabinet-level agency in Pennsylvania
 Rhode Island Department of Administration a agency of the government of Rhode Island
 West Virginia Department of Administration an agency of the state of West Virginia
 Wisconsin Department of Administration an agency of the Wisconsin state government

Other governmental organisations 
 Department of Finance and Administration a former government department in Australia
 Department of Public Service and Administration, a department of the government of South Africa
 Federal Office of Administration an agency of the German federal government 
 Ministry of Public Administration (Croatia) a ministry of the Government of Croatia

Other organisations 
 Central Department of Public Administration, the academic department for public administration studies, part of Tribhuvan University in Nepal
  responsible for the administrative, financial and developmental functions of the archdiocese